Empalactis is a genus of moths in the family Gelechiidae.

Species
 Empalactis ponomarenkoae Ueda, 2012
 Empalactis sporogramma Meyrick, 1921

References

Chelariini